Justice League Task Force is a competitive fighting game produced by Sunsoft and distributed by Acclaim for the Super Nintendo Entertainment System and Genesis in 1995. The Super NES version was co-developed by Blizzard Entertainment and the Genesis version by Condor, Inc. (later known as Blizzard North).

It involves characters from DC Comics' Justice League, including Superman, Batman, Wonder Woman, Green Arrow, The Flash, and Aquaman. Additional Justice League members Martian Manhunter and Fire, as well as the supervillain Shrapnel, were also planned to appear, but had to be omitted due to memory limitations.

Story

Darkseid attacks the planet Earth, destroying a military base in the process. The player takes control of a member of the Justice League of their choosing, and tracks down the other members for information, only to be attacked by them. As the hero defeats the other Justice League members, they discover that they are in fact android duplicates. Coming to this conclusion, the hero battles Cheetah and then Despero for more information.

They both lead the hero to Darkseid, who then forces the hero to fight their own duplicate. Upon defeating the clone, the hero must face Darkseid himself. After the hero defeats him, the other League members are freed, and the military base is restored.

Reception
Justice League Task Force received mostly negative reviews. The four reviewers of Electronic Gaming Monthly scored the Genesis version a 5.875 out of 10, criticizing the choppy animation, limited number of moves, and most especially the poor controls, which they said made executing special moves "too much work to be any fun." GamePro gave negative reviews to both the Genesis and SNES versions, similarly citing poor controls, unimpressive special moves, and sprites which look good in still frame but ugly in animation.

Next Generation reviewed both ports of the game and gave them two out of five stars. For the Genesis, they stated, "squint your eyes and you could swear you're playing any of the other many fighting games, that doesn't mean Justice League is awful, it's just real normal." For the SNES version: "comic book fans and fighting fans should get a kick out of it, but everyone else is likely to yawn."

See also
Mortal Kombat vs. DC Universe
Injustice: Gods Among Us
Injustice 2

References

External links
 

1995 video games
Batman video games
Blizzard games
Cancelled Windows games
Sega Genesis games
Sunsoft games
Super Nintendo Entertainment System games
Superhero video games
Superman video games
Fighting games
Task Force (games), Justice League
Video games based on DC Comics
Video games developed in the United States
Video games scored by Matt Uelmen
Green Arrow in other media
Video games set in Africa
Video games set in Seattle
Video games set in the United States
Video games set in Atlantis